Bruno Hubschmid (born 7 March 1950) is a Swiss former cyclist. He competed at the 1968 Summer Olympics and the 1972 Summer Olympics.

Notes
 Miroir du cyclisme, n°201, June 1975.

References

External links
 

1950 births
Living people
Swiss male cyclists
Olympic cyclists of Switzerland
Cyclists at the 1968 Summer Olympics
Cyclists at the 1972 Summer Olympics